Joseph Cassar (22 December 1947  – 19 May 2018) was a Maltese journalist, diplomat and academic who served as a United Nations representative and as an Ambassador to Portugal, Italy, Libya, and Russia. He died on 19 May 2018 due to old age.

References

1947 births
2018 deaths
Maltese journalists
Maltese diplomats
Maltese academics
Ambassadors of Malta to Portugal
Ambassadors of Malta to Italy
Ambassadors of Malta to Libya
Ambassadors of Malta to Russia
Permanent Representatives of Malta to the United Nations